The athletics at the 1974 Asian Games were held in Aryamehr Stadium, Tehran, Iran. This was the first time that China competed in these games and also the last time that Israel competed.

Medalists

Men

Women

Medal table

References
Asian Games Results. GBR Athletics. Retrieved on 2014-10-04.
Women's relay medallists. Incheon2014. Retrieved on 2014-10-04.
Men's relay medallists. Incheon2014. Retrieved on 2014-10-04.

 
Athletics
1974
Asian Games
1974 Asian Games